2019–20 Hong Kong Senior Challenge Shield is the 118th season of the Hong Kong Senior Shield. 10 teams entered this edition, with 2 games being played in the First Round before the quarter-finals stage. The competition was only open to teams that played in the 2019–20 Hong Kong Premier League.

The champions received HK$150,000 in prize money while the runners up received HK$50,000. The MVP of the final received a HK$10,000 bonus.

The final of the Senior Shield was originally held on 9 February 2020, but was postponed to 2 October 2020 and was played behind closed doors due to the 2020 coronavirus pandemic in Hong Kong.

Kitchee were the defending champions, but were eliminated in the quarter-finals. Eastern became the champions for the 11th time after beating Lee Man in the final.

Calendar

Source: HKFA

Bracket

Bold = winner
* = after extra time, = penalty shootout score

Fixtures and results

First round

Quarter-finals

Semi-finals

Final

Notes

Top scorers

References

External links
 Senior Shield - Hong Kong Football Association

2019–20
2019–20 in Hong Kong football
2019–20 domestic association football cups
Hong Kong Senior Challenge Shield, 2019-20